is a private university in with its main campus in Ikebukuro, Toshima, Tokyo; Kita, Tokyo; Naka-ku, Nagoya; and Isesaki, Gunma.

Organization

Graduate schools
Graduate School of Social Welfare
Graduate Course in Social Welfare
Graduate Course in Childcare
Graduate School of Education
Graduate Course in Education
Graduate School of Psychology
Graduate Course in Clinical Psychology

Undergraduate schools
School of Social Welfare
Division of Social Work
Division of Child Care and Early Childhood Education
School of Education
Division of Education
School of Psychology
Division of Psychology

Special course
Japanese Language Program

Junior college
Tokyo University of Social Welfare Junior College

Campuses

It has four campuses.

Ikebukuro campus (Higashi-Ikebukuro, Toshima, Tokyo)
Oji campus (Horifune, Kita, Tokyo)
Nagoya campus (Naka-ku, Nagoya, Aichi)
Isesaki campus (San-ou-cho, Isesaki, Gunma)

References

External links

 Official website

Educational institutions established in 2000
Private universities and colleges in Japan
Universities and colleges in Tokyo
Universities and colleges in Nagoya
Universities and colleges in Gunma Prefecture
2000 establishments in Japan